Hillhead Student Village (formerly Hillhead Halls of Residence) is a group of buildings that provide accommodation for students at the University of Aberdeen.

History 
Hillhead Halls was built in response to the post-war expansion of the university. The first phase of the Hillhead Halls of Residence was opened in 1968 and as a result this was the first year that the university could offer accommodation to every female applicant and a majority of male applicants. The previous year, five out of six applicants were refused. The first blocks to open were Adam-Smith House, Fyfe House, and Wavell House. When combined with the existing Crombie, Johnston, and Dunbar halls, the university had a total of 1168 places available.

Hillhead has since been expanded with the newest accommodation block, New Carnegie Court, opened in 2008.

Location 
Hillhead Student Village is situated beside the River Don and Seaton Park. The Kings College campus is accessible by walking through Seaton Park.

Facilities 
The central building at Hillhead contains a franchised Co-op Food shop, a community kitchen, café bar, and an  Amazon parcel locker. Next to the central building, there are bike storage sheds and a launderette. Free parking is also available.

Transportation 

Starting in late 1968, the number 20 bus service which ran from Marischal College to Old Aberdeen was extended to serve Hillhead.

The number 20 bus route connects Hillhead to the city centre. Route 13 also extends to Hillhead during evenings and weekends. The 9U runs between Hillhead, the Sir Duncan Rice Library, and Aberdeen Royal Infirmary. It was also historically connected by routes 21 and 60.

References 

Areas of Aberdeen
University of Aberdeen